Abdessamad Ouhakki (born 12 August 1988) is a Moroccan footballer who plays for Al-Nahda Club in the Oman Professional League.

Club career
Abdessamad began his professional career with Raja Casablanca in 2007. He helped the club to win the Arab Summer Cup in 2007, the Moroccan League in the 2008–09 season, the Antifi Cup in 2009 and helped them to reach the finals of the Antifi Cup in 2009. He again helped his club to reach the second position in the Moroccan League in the 2009–10 season and win the league in the 2010–11 season.

After spending a long five-seasons spell in Morocco with Raja Casablanca, he moved to the United Arab Emirates in 2012 where he signed a six-months contract with Ajman Club. He played in five matches and helped his team to win the 2013 Etisalat Emirates Cup. He made his UAE Pro League debut for Ajman Club on 5 October 2012 in a 2-1 loss against Al Jazira Club.

On 26 January 2014, he signed a six-month contract with Al-Nahda Club of Oman. He helped his team to reach the finals of the 2012 Sultan Qaboos Cup.

Club career statistics

Honours

Club
With Raja Casablanca
Moroccan League (2): 2008–09, 2010–11; Runner-up 2009–10
Moroccan Cup (1): 2012
Arab Summer Cup (1): 2007
Antifi Cup (1): 2009; Runner-up 2010
With Ajman
Etisalat Emirates Cup (1): 2013
With Al-Nahda
Oman Professional League (1): 2013-14
Sultan Qaboos Cup (0): Runner-up 2012, 2013

References

External links
Player Info at Goalzz.com
Player Info at Goalzz.com

1988 births
Living people
Moroccan footballers
Footballers from Casablanca
Moroccan expatriate footballers
Association football midfielders
Raja CA players
Ajman Club players
Al Dhaid SC players
Al-Nahda Club (Oman) players
Al Urooba Club players
Association Salé players
UAE First Division League players
Expatriate footballers in the United Arab Emirates
Moroccan expatriate sportspeople in the United Arab Emirates
Expatriate footballers in Oman
Moroccan expatriate sportspeople in Oman
UAE Pro League players